The Boston mayoral election of 1951 occurred on Tuesday, November 6, 1951, between Mayor of Boston John B. Hynes and former Mayor James Michael Curley. Hynes was elected to his second term.

This was the first Boston mayoral race with a preliminary election, which was held on Tuesday, September 25, 1951. In November 1949, voters had approved changing the structure of future mayoral contests to include a preliminary election, non-partisan in nature, to select two final candidates in advance of each general election, which would remain non-partisan. It also shifted the years in which elections would be held. The first such election had been set for 1951, meaning that Hynes' previous term was only two years in duration.

Inaugural exercises were held Monday, January 7, 1952.

Candidates
James Michael Curley, Mayor of Boston from 1914 to 1918, 1922 to 1926, 1930 to 1934, 1946 to 1950. Member of the United States House of Representatives from 1913 to 1914 and from 1943 to 1947. Governor of Massachusetts from 1935 to 1937. Member of the Massachusetts House of Representatives from 1902–1903.
John B. Hynes, Mayor of Boston, Massachusetts since 1950, Acting Mayor in 1947.

Candidates eliminated in preliminary
Thomas J. O'Brien, resident of Roxbury.
Joseph F. Timilty, Boston Police Commissioner from 1936 to 1943.

Results

See also
List of mayors of Boston, Massachusetts

References

Boston mayoral
Boston
Mayoral elections in Boston
Non-partisan elections
1950s in Boston